William Everett "Ebby" DeWeese (September 7, 1904 – July 18, 1942) was an American football player who played three seasons in the National Football League with the Dayton Triangles and Portsmouth Spartans. He is buried in Hill Grove Cemetery in Montgomery County, Ohio.

References

External links
Just Sports Stats

1904 births
1942 deaths
American football guards
American football fullbacks
American football linebackers
Dayton Triangles players
Portsmouth Spartans players
Players of American football from Ohio
People from Miamisburg, Ohio